James River Corporation was an American pulp and paper company based in Richmond, Virginia, once the largest paper manufacturer in the world.

History
The company was founded in 1969 as the James River Paper Company by Brenton Halsey and Robert Williams, with the purchase of Ethyl Corporation's Specialty Papers Division. Halsey and Williams were both former employees of Albemarle Paper Manufacturing Company; the city of Richmond lies along the James River.

The company changed its name to the James River Corporation in 1973, and it acquired the Dixie/Northern division of American Can Company in 1982.

In 1986, James River acquired the fine paper mill assets of Crown Zellerbach, headquartered in San Francisco, and became the largest paper manufacturer in the world. The brown paper division of CZ was not in the deal and became Gaylord Container Corporation. Crown Zellerbach had been the target of a hostile takeover by Sir James Goldsmith.

James River began producing 100 percent recycled paper products in 1991 at its mill in Green Bay, Wisconsin. Some of the products included Recycled Northern Bath Tissue, Recycled Brawn Towels, and Recycled Northern Napkins. Also that year, the company sold twenty-two paper mills to Specialty Coatings Group.

In 1997, the company merged with the Fort Howard Paper Company of Green Bay, forming the Fort James Corporation. At the time of their merger, James River was one of the largest paper manufacturers, with 60 manufacturing facilities in North America and Europe. Three years later in 2000, Fort James was acquired by Georgia-Pacific, based in Atlanta.

In 1998, Halsey and Williams, the company's founders, were both inducted into the Paper Industry International Hall of Fame.

Legacy
The historical records of the James River Corporation are housed at the Virginia Historical Society.

References

Pulp and paper companies of the United States
Defunct pulp and paper companies
Georgia-Pacific
Manufacturing companies based in Richmond, Virginia
American companies established in 1969
Manufacturing companies established in 1969
Manufacturing companies disestablished in 1997
1969 establishments in Virginia
1997 disestablishments in Virginia
Defunct manufacturing companies based in Virginia